The Yamada-kun and the Seven Witches manga is written and illustrated by Miki Yoshikawa and serialized in Kodansha's Weekly Shōnen Magazine. The first chapter was published in 2012's 12th issue, released on February 12, 2012. The series is also released in tankōbon volumes, the first of which was published on June 15, 2012. On October 26, 2013, Crunchyroll announced a partnership with Kodansha where it would distribute chapters digitally to 170 countries.

Volume list

References

External links
 Yamada-kun and the Seven Witches at Crunchyroll 

Yamada-kun to 7-nin no Majo